Pauline Edeth Alpert Rooff (December 27, 1905 - April 11, 1988) was a pianist who performed, composed, recorded, and produced Duo-Art piano rolls in the United States. She performed in several films and made recordings with a few record labels. She did radio shows in New York City and toured.

Career
She performed during the intermission of the Broadway show Rufus LeMaire's Affairs in 1927.

She made numerous Victor Records recordings. She recorded the album Sparkling Piano Melodies on Sonora Records.

She featured in two Vitaphone Varieties short film episodes dated March 1927.

Pauline Alpert's folio of modern piano songs includes musical scores for:

'Dream of a doll" 
March of the blues" 
"Night of romance" 
"Ivory tips" 
"Piano poker" 
"The merry minnow" 
"Perils of Pauline"

A recording of her playing "Doll Dance" is on the 1981 album  Ragtime Piano Novelties of the 20's.

Discography

Filmography
What Price Piano
Katz' Pajamas

Legacy
Novelty Masterpieces of the Gershwin Era: The Music of Zez Confrey, Pauline Alpert and Rube Bloom by Peter Mintun

See also
Novelty piano

References

20th-century American pianists

1905 births
1988 deaths